United Nations Security Council Resolution 144, adopted on July 19, 1960, acknowledging that the situation existing between Cuba and the United States was growing more tense but also that it was the subject of ongoing debate inside the Organization of American States, the Council decided to delay action on the matter until receiving a report from the OAS.  The Council urged all other States to refrain from any action which might increase the existing tensions between the two nations.

Resolution 144 was adopted by nine votes to none, while the People's Republic of Poland and Soviet Union abstained.

See also
List of United Nations Security Council Resolutions 101 to 200 (1953–1965)

References

Text of the Resolution at undocs.org

External links
 

 0144
1960 in the United States
1960 in Cuba
Cuba–United States relations
 0144
 0144
July 1960 events